is a Japanese politician of the Democratic Party of Japan, a member of the House of Representatives in the Diet (national legislature). A native of Nishikasugai District, Aichi and graduate of Keio University, he was elected to the House of Representatives for the first time in 1990 as an independent.

References

External links 
  in Japanese.

Members of the House of Representatives (Japan)
Keio University alumni
Politicians from Aichi Prefecture
Living people
1960 births
Democratic Party of Japan politicians
21st-century Japanese politicians